Nikola Nešić (born 1988) is a Serbian politician. He was elected to the National Assembly of Serbia in 2022 on the electoral list of the We Must (Moramo) coalition and is now a member of the Together (Zajedno!) party.

Early life and private career
Nešić was born in Kragujevac, in what was then the Socialist Republic of Serbia in the Socialist Federal Republic of Yugoslavia. Raised in the city, he holds a master's degree in electrical engineering and computing from the Department of Telecommunications at the Faculty of Electronics in Niš and has worked at Serbia Broadband.

Politician

Local politics
Nešić co-founded the local party New Strength (Nova Snaga) in Kragujevac in 2014 and was recognized as its leader. The party contested the 2016 local election in Kragujevac on the electoral list of Boris Tadić's Social Democratic Party (Socijaldemokratska stranka, SDS), and Nešić appeared in the seventh position on the party's electoral list. The list won six mandates, and he was not immediately elected. He did, however, receive a mandate on 6 June 2016 as the replacement for another candidate. Some elected members of the SDS left the party soon after the election to join the governing coalition led by the rival Serbian Progressive Party (Srpska napredna stranka, SNS). Nešić wrote unfavourably of this situation, and of his experience working with the SDS generally, in an article published the following year.

New Strength contested the 2020 Serbian local elections in Kragujevac on an independent coalition list called Alternativa. Nešić received the second position on the list and was re-elected when it won four mandates.

In June 2021, New Strength collectively joined "Action" (Akcija), a citizens' initiative established by the party Together for Serbia (Zajedno za Srbiju, ZZS). The following month, New Strength made the decision to collectively join Together for Serbia outright.

Parliamentarian
Together for Serbia and "Action" contested the 2022 Serbian parliamentary election as part of the We Must (Moramo) coalition. Nešić was awarded the fifth position on the coalition's electoral list and was elected when it won thirteen mandates. Shortly after the election, Together for Serbia and "Action" merged into a new party called Together (Zajedno!). Nešić is now a member of this party. In the national assembly, he serves as a member of the committee on spatial planning, transport, infrastructure, and telecommunications; a deputy member of the committee on the economy, regional development, trade, tourism, and energy; and a deputy member of Serbia's delegation to the Parliamentary Assembly of the Mediterranean. The SNS and its allies won the election, and the Together group serves in opposition.

References

1988 births
Living people
Politicians from Kragujevac
Members of the National Assembly (Serbia)
Deputy Members of the Parliamentary Assembly of the Mediterranean
Together for Serbia politicians
Together (Serbia) politicians
21st-century Serbian politicians